North Quincy station is an MBTA subway Red Line station in Quincy, Massachusetts. It is located in North Quincy, off Hancock Street (Route 3A). A major park-and-ride stop, it has over 1200 parking spaces for commuters. It also serves as a minor bus terminal, with five MBTA bus routes stopping at the south end of the station. The station is fully accessible.

It opened in 1971 along with Wollaston and Quincy Center as the first section of the South Shore Line section of the Red Line. It is the only one of the four Red Line stations in Quincy not located at a former Old Colony Railroad station site; the Old Colony served Atlantic and Norfolk Downs stations short distances away.

Station layout

North Quincy station has a single island platform serving the two tracks of the Red Line. Two tracks carrying the Old Colony Lines and Greenbush Line are adjacent to the west. Parking lots are located on both sides of the tracks. At the south end of the platform, a footbridge connects to the West Squantum Street busway on the east side of the tracks. At the north end of the platform, a footbridge connects to both sides of the tracks.

Three MBTA bus routes stop at a busway at the southern (West Squantum Street) end of the station:
:  - 
: Quincy Center Station - Squantum
: Quincy Center Station - North Quincy Station

History

Old Colony Railroad

The Old Colony Railroad opened through Quincy in November 1845. Several local stations were added in Quincy, including Atlantic at Atlantic Avenue (now Sagamore Street). In 1848, the Old Colony built its Gravel Branch from Atlantic to Montclair, but abandoned it the next year. In 1871 it was rebuilt, extended, and connected to the Granite Railway as the Granite Branch. Norfolk Downs station at Billings Road was added in the 1890s when the surrounding marshland was filled and developed.

The Old Colony switched from English-style left-hand running to American-style right-hand running in 1893 when it was acquired by the New York, New Haven and Hartford Railroad. Unlike nearby Wollaston, Atlantic station was already on the east side of the tracks and was not moved. New station buildings – low brick structures very similar to the extant building at  – were built at Atlantic and Quincy in 1900.

Passenger service on the Granite Branch ended in 1940. Ridership on the Old Colony system declined further after World War II, and the New Haven decided to abandon the line in the late 1950s. Emergency subsidies kept the lines open during construction of the Southeast Expressway, but all passenger service to Atlantic, Norfolk Downs and the rest of the former Old Colony system was ended on June 30, 1959.

Red Line
Even before 1959, discussion was underway to bring rapid transit to the Old Colony mainline. The 1926 Report on Improved Transportation Facilities and 1945–47 Coolidge Commission Report recommended a branch of the Cambridge-Dorchester Line (later renamed as the Red Line) to parallel the Old Colony mainline to Braintree, taking over service on local stops. The newly formed MBTA bought the Old Colony right-of-way from South Boston to South Braintree in 1965. In 1966, the Program for Mass Transportation recommended the extension. The city wanted new stations at both Atlantic and Norfolk Downs, but the MBTA ultimately chose a less expensive plan for a single station between the two sites. Construction of the station began in 1966, and North Quincy opened along with Wollaston and Quincy Center on September 1, 1971.

The elevators were built in 1998, making the station accessible.

Development

An office building and private parking garage were constructed on a parking lot on the west side of the station in 1983. The MBTA and city initially clashed over the agency taking city land by eminent domain; ultimately, the city purchased the air rights from the MBTA for one dollar and surrendered the property. In October 1997, North Quincy was identified as a possible site for a parking garage. The project was cancelled due to concerns over its financial viability. 

In February 2016, three bidders submitted proposals for mixed-use transit-oriented development to be built on the Hancock Street lot, with a new garage to replace lost parking spaces. That April, the MBTA board approved a 99-year lease of the lot to a developer. The developer would build a 1,307-space garage, with 852 spaces reserved for MBTA parking, as part of the project. The Quincy Planning Board approved the project, with the garage increased to 1,600 spaces, in June 2017. Shortly before construction was expected to begin, a local carpenters union petitioned the state to force a public bidding process for the garage because it will be operated by the MBTA. In April 2018, Massachusetts Attorney General Maura Healey ruled that the MBTA or the developers were legally required to publicly bid for the garage construction.

Construction on the garage - the first part of the $205 million development - began on February 17, 2019.

References

External links

MBTA - North Quincy
MBTA - North Quincy Garage and Development
North Quincy Station development
Google Maps Street View: Hunt Street entrance, West Squantum Street entrance

Red Line (MBTA) stations
Railway stations in Norfolk County, Massachusetts
Railway stations in the United States opened in 1971
Stations along Old Colony Railroad lines
Buildings and structures in Quincy, Massachusetts